Brandenberger Bluff is a steep rock bluff,  high, at the extreme north side of Mount Berlin in the Flood Range, Marie Byrd Land. It was mapped by the United States Geological Survey from surveys and from U.S. Navy air photos, 1959–65, and named by the Advisory Committee on Antarctic Names for Arthur J. Brandenberger, United States Antarctic Research Program glaciologist with the Byrd Station Traverse of 1962–63.

References
 

Cliffs of Marie Byrd Land
Flood Range